Normandy Isles Historic District is a U.S. Historic District encompassing the Normandy Isles neighborhood of Miami Beach, Florida. It is roughly bounded by the Normandy Shores Golf Course, Indian Creek, Biscayne Bay, Rue Versailles, 71st Street, and Rue Notre Dame. On November 12, 2008, it was added to the U.S. National Register of Historic Places.

References

External links

 Normandy Isles Historic District boundary map

National Register of Historic Places in Miami-Dade County, Florida
Historic districts on the National Register of Historic Places in Florida